Soapy Water and Mister Marmalade is an album by punk band Sham 69, released in 1995 (see 1995 in music).

Track listing
All songs by Jimmy Pursey unless noted
 "Listen Up" - 4:17
 "Girlfriend" - 3:59
 "Little Bit of This" - 3:36 (Max Coon, Darren Courtney*, Dave Guy Parsons, Pursey)
 "Otis Redding" - 3:57
 "Junkie" - 4:05
 "The Doctor's Song" - 4:09 (Max Coon, Darren Courtney*, Parsons, Pursey)
 "Alice" - 4:20
 "Stevie (Sweet as a Nut)" - 3:38
 "Chasing the Moon" - 3:09
 "Spunky Candy" - 4:20

Personnel
Jimmy Pursey - vocals
Dave Guy Parsons - guitar, arranger
Darren Courtney* - guitar, arranger
Max Coon* - bass guitar
John Burns - producer, engineer
Brian Adams - executive producer
David Paramor - executive producer
James Rexroad - inlay photography, sleeve photo

References 

1995 albums
Sham 69 albums